Howard Harris (born 13 November 1970) is a Jamaican cricketer. He played in one List A match for the Jamaican cricket team in 1998/99.

See also
 List of Jamaican representative cricketers

References

External links
 

1970 births
Living people
Jamaican cricketers
Jamaica cricketers
People from Saint Ann Parish